Daniel Hersog is a Canadian jazz trumpeter and band leader. He is a member of the faculty at Capilano University and the Vancouver Symphony Orchestra School of Music. Hersog graduated from New England Conservatory in 2016.

Hersog's first album Night Devoid of Stars, featuring Noah Preminger and Frank Carlberg was released in 2020. He has toured North America leading large ensembles featuring such notable musicians as Terry Clarke, Kevin Turcotte, Remy Le Boeuf, Brad Turner, Billy Buss, Stuart Mack, Jason Palmer, Kim Cass, and the Jaelem Bhate Jazz Orchestra.

He is a recipient of the Gunther Schuller Medal, is an inductee to the Pi Kappa Lambda honors society, and has performed multiple times at the Vancouver International Jazz Festival.

Discography

As leader 

 2020 - Night Devoid of Stars (Cellar Music) - Daniel Hersog Jazz Orchestra

As sideperson 

 2018 - The Hurt of Happiness - Hey Ocean! 
 2019 - On the Edge - Jaelem Bhate Jazz Orchestra
 2020 - Carmen Suite - Jaelem Bhate Jazz Orchestra

References

1985 births
Living people
Canadian male jazz musicians
Academic staff of Capilano University
21st-century trumpeters
21st-century Canadian male musicians
Canadian jazz trumpeters
Male trumpeters
New England Conservatory alumni